The University of South Carolina Press is an academic publisher associated with the University of South Carolina. It was founded in 1944.

By the early 1990s, the press had published several surveys of women's writing in the southern United States in a series called Women's Diaries and Letters of the Nineteenth Century South, edited by Carol Bleser. According to Casey Clabough, the quality of its list of authors and book design became substantially better between the 2000s and 2010s.

See also

 List of English-language book publishing companies
 List of university presses

References 

1944 establishments in South Carolina
Academic publishing companies
University of South Carolina